Francis Anthony Hoste Henley (11 February 1884 – 26 June 1963) was an English first-class cricketer active 1903–08 who played for Middlesex and Oxford University. He was a son of Anthony Henley, who played cricket for Hampshire.

Henley was born  on 11 February 1884 in Woodbridge, Suffolk, and was educated at Oriel College, Oxford. He was a son of Anthony Henley, who played cricket for Hampshire. During World War I he was an officer in the Army Service Corps. In 1924 he wrote The Boys' Book of Cricket. He died on 26 June 1963 in Wheathampstead, aged 79 years old .

References

1884 births
1963 deaths
English cricketers
Middlesex cricketers
Oxford University cricketers
Marylebone Cricket Club cricketers
Suffolk cricketers
Alumni of Oriel College, Oxford
Royal Army Service Corps officers
British Army personnel of World War I